Sunnyhills is a suburb of Auckland, New Zealand. It is part of the Pakuranga Electorate.

Demographics

Sunnyhills had a population of 6,885 at the 2018 New Zealand census, an increase of 270 people (4.1%) since the 2013 census, and an increase of 501 people (7.8%) since the 2006 census. There were 2,334 households, comprising 3,282 males and 3,603 females, giving a sex ratio of 0.91 males per female, with 1,302 people (18.9%) aged under 15 years, 1,230 (17.9%) aged 15 to 29, 3,042 (44.2%) aged 30 to 64, and 1,311 (19.0%) aged 65 or older.

Ethnicities were 55.2% European/Pākehā, 6.2% Māori, 3.8% Pacific peoples, 40.1% Asian, and 3.2% other ethnicities. People may identify with more than one ethnicity.

The percentage of people born overseas was 47.2, compared with 27.1% nationally.

Although some people chose not to answer the census's question about religious affiliation, 45.4% had no religion, 36.6% were Christian, 0.2% had Māori religious beliefs, 4.2% were Hindu, 1.7% were Muslim, 2.6% were Buddhist and 3.5% had other religions.

Of those at least 15 years old, 1,674 (30.0%) people had a bachelor's or higher degree, and 708 (12.7%) people had no formal qualifications. 1,128 people (20.2%) earned over $70,000 compared to 17.2% nationally. The employment status of those at least 15 was that 2,601 (46.6%) people were employed full-time, 729 (13.1%) were part-time, and 177 (3.2%) were unemployed.

Education

Other schools in the Pakuranga area close to Sunnyhills are: Riverina Primary School, Wakaaranga Primary School, Anchorage Park Primary School, Farm Cove Intermediate, Pakuranga Intermediate, Saint Kentigern College, Pakuranga College and Edgewater College.

References

Suburbs of Auckland
Populated places on the Tāmaki River
Howick Local Board Area